Death Note: New Generation (デスノート NEW GENERATION) is a Japanese supernatural psychological thriller  live-action web series, based on the manga series Death Note written by Tsugumi Ohba and illustrated by Takeshi Obata. It is a sequel to the 2006 film Death Note 2: The Last Name and the predecessor  to 2016's Death Note: Light Up the New World film. The three-episode series was released weekly on Hulu Japan beginning on September 16, 2016.

Plot 
Three stories about the investigator Mishima, called the Death Note otaku, who encounters a case where a former criminal died of stroke and he closes in on the truth; L's successor, the famous international sleuth Ryuzaki who has solved numerous difficult cases, decides to assist in a Death Note case that he has continuously refused despite repeated requests; and cyber terrorist Shien, who became a follower of "Kira" after he was set free from the trauma of being the only one who survived the brutal murder of his family, attempts to use the Death Note for the first time.

Cast
Masahiro Higashide as Tsukuru Mishima, leader of the Death Note task force.
Sosuke Ikematsu as Ryūzaki, the original successor to L.
Masaki Suda as Yūki Shien, a cyber-terrorist who worships Kira.
Rina Kawaei as Sakura Aoi, a Death Note owner.
Sota Aoyama as Tōta Matsuda, a young detective who experienced the Kira case 10 years ago.
Mina Fujii as Shō Nanase, the only female member in the Death Note task force.
Noémie Nakai as J, a woman from Wammy's House.
Daisuke Sakaguchi as Near, a boy from Wammy's House who defeated the original Kira, Light Yagami.
Nakamura Shidō II as Ryuk (voice), a shinigami, who has returned to Earth after 10 years.
Tomoya Nakamura as Taichi Kanagawa aka Taichi Amazawa, murderer of a girl and a victim of the Death Note.
Tatsuya Fujiwara as Light Yagami (cameo), the original Kira, who is killed by shinigami Ryuk.
Kenichi Matsuyama as L, the greatest detective, who died by suicide as a result of battling Kira, Light Yagami.
Suzuka Morita as Karin Kintomo (episode 2).

Episodes

References

External links

Death Note
2016 web series debuts
Hulu Japan